Qasemabad (also Romanized as Qāsemābād; also known as Kāz̧emābād and Qāsimābād) is a village in Kabutar Khan Rural District, in the Central District of Rafsanjan County, Kerman Province, Iran. At the 2006 census, its population was 176, in 43 families.

References 

Populated places in Rafsanjan County